Woodside Hills is an unincorporated community in New Castle County, Delaware, United States. Woodside Hills is located northwest of the intersection of Silverside Road and Carr Road to the northeast of Wilmington.

References 

Unincorporated communities in New Castle County, Delaware
Unincorporated communities in Delaware